Jessica Moore and Ellen Perez were the defending champions, but chose to participate with different partners. Moore partnered alongside Monique Adamczak but lost in the first round to Viktorija Golubic and Ingrid Neel. Perez partnered alongside Arina Rodionova but lost in the first round to Naiktha Bains and Naomi Broady.

Jennifer Brady and Caroline Dolehide won the title, defeating Heather Watson and Yanina Wickmayer in the final, 6–3, 6–4.

Seeds

Draw

Draw

References

External Links
Main Draw

Surbiton Trophy - Doubles